Erebus terminitincta is a moth of the family Erebidae first described by Max Gaede in 1938. It is found in Australia, where it has been recorded from the Northern Territory, Queensland and New South Wales.

The wings are dark brown with a ragged white arc. There is an eyespot on the forewings and a white mark at the tip of the hindwings.

The larvae feed on Smilax australis. Young larvae are patchy brown with orange knobs. Older larvae have orange spots along the sides. The last instar larva is patchy brown, with a rusty brown head. Pupation takes place in a cocoon made of pale brown silk, created amongst dead leaves and stems of the host plant.

References

Moths described in 1938
Erebus (moth)